Aziz Zoromba is a Canadian film director from Montreal, Quebec. He is most noted for his short film Simo, which was the winner of the Best Canadian Short Film award at the 2022 Toronto International Film Festival.

He previously directed the short films Leila (2017), Amal (2018) and Faraway (2020), and was a producer of Carol Nguyen's short documentary film No Crying at the Dinner Table.

References

External links

21st-century Canadian screenwriters
21st-century Canadian male writers
Film producers from Quebec
Canadian people of Egyptian descent
Film directors from Montreal
Writers from Montreal
Living people
Year of birth missing (living people)